The Posmak is a river in Perm Krai, Russia, a left tributary of the Vels, which in turn is a tributary of the Vishera.

References 

Rivers of Perm Krai